Thiago Elias do Nascimento Silva (born 9 June 1987), known as Thiago Elias, is a Brazilian footballer.

References

External links
 
 

Brazilian footballers
1987 births
Living people
K League 1 players
Incheon United FC players
Brazilian expatriate footballers
Brazilian expatriate sportspeople in South Korea
Association football forwards